Exaeretia vladimiri is a moth in the family Depressariidae. It was described by Alexandr L. Lvovsky in 1984. It is found in Turkmenistan, southern Kazakhstan and southern Uzbekistan.

References

Moths described in 1984
Exaeretia
Moths of Asia